In cryptography, Square (sometimes written SQUARE)  is a block cipher invented by Joan Daemen and Vincent Rijmen. The design, published in 1997, is a forerunner to Rijndael, which has been adopted as the Advanced Encryption Standard. Square was introduced together with a new form of cryptanalysis discovered by Lars Knudsen, called the "Square attack".

The structure of Square is a substitution–permutation network with eight rounds, operating on 128-bit blocks and using a 128-bit key.

Square is not patented.

References

External links
 SCAN's entry for Square

Block ciphers